MaraDNS is an open-source (BSD licensed) Domain Name System (DNS) implementation, which acts as either a caching, recursive, or authoritative nameserver.

Features 
MaraDNS has a string library, which is buffer overflow resistant and has its own random number generator. While MaraDNS does not directly support BIND zone files, its zone file format is similar and a converter to convert from BIND's zone file format is included. MaraDNS runs as an unprivileged user inside of a chroot environment, while MaraDNS specifies the user and group to run as by user-ID, Simon Burnet has made a patch that makes it possible to supply a username  MaraDNS can add both IP records and the corresponding PTR "reverse DNS lookup" record. It can be used as a master DNS server, and, with some caveats, as a slave DNS server. MaraDNS currently does not support DNSSEC because of a lack of money for the developer to implement it using the LibTom library.

Deadwood includes built-in "DNS wall" filtering (to protect against external domains which resolve to local IPs), the ability to read and write the cache to a file, DNS-over-TCP support, the ability to optionally reject MX, IPv6 AAAA, and PTR queries, code that stops AR-spoofing attacks, among other features.

MaraDNS releases are distributed with a BSD-type license.

See also 

 Comparison of DNS server software

References

External links
 Official website
 Official blog
 Rick Moen on Deadwood (MaraDNS 2's recursive resolver)
 Rick Moen on MaraDNS

DNS software
Free network-related software
DNS server software for Linux
Software using the BSD license